A tugboat is a boat that maneuvers vessels by pushing or towing them.

Tugboat may also refer to:

TUGboat, journal of digital typography
Tugboat (wrestler), WWE wrestler
Tugboat (football player), football player and coach
"Tugboat", the closing track on Galaxie 500 album Today